Jean-Pierre Darras (1927–1999) was a French actor.

Filmography

1927 births
1999 deaths
Deaths from cancer in France
French film directors
French monarchists
Male actors from Paris
People from Val-de-Marne
French male film actors
French male television actors
French male stage actors
20th-century French male actors